Jacobus Gerardus Weber (4 August 1901 – 30 September 1979) was a Dutch footballer who earned 14 caps for the Dutch national side between 1927 and 1928, scoring one goal. Weber also  participated at the 1928 Summer Olympics, and played club football with Feyenoord and Sparta Rotterdam.

References

External links
  Player profile at VoetbalStats.nl

1901 births
1979 deaths
Dutch footballers
Netherlands international footballers
Olympic footballers of the Netherlands
Footballers at the 1928 Summer Olympics
Feyenoord players
Sparta Rotterdam players
Footballers from Rotterdam
Association football forwards